Nico van der Vegt (born 1970 in Raalte) is a Dutch chemist and a professor for computational physical chemistry at Technische Universität Darmstadt.

Academic career 
Van der Vegt studied chemical engineering and received his PhD from the University of Twente in 1998 on a study of methods for calculating thermodynamic and transport properties of small molecules in polymer membranes based on computer simulations. From 1998 to 2002, he was a lecturer at the University of Twente. Following this, he worked as a postdoctoral researcher at ETH Zürich with Wilfred F. van Gunsteren from 2002 to 2003. He then led a research group at the Max Planck Institute for Polymer Research, Mainz, Germany. In 2009, he was appointed as a full professor for computational physical chemistry at the Technische Universität Darmstadt.

Research 
His main research interests center on the thermodynamics and statistical mechanics of liquids and soft matter systems. His work includes studies on the physical fundamentals and thermodynamics of aqueous solvation, including cosolvent and salt effects on the water solubility of macromolecules and the stability of proteins. To this end, he works on the development of intermolecular potential models and computational methods for atomistic and coarse-grained molecular dynamics simulations of liquids, polymers, and biological materials. As of May 2022, he has authored more than 170 scientific publications (ResearcherID: B-3441-2010).

References

External links 
 Website Van der Vegt Group
 Website Department of Chemistry TU Darmstadt
 

Living people
1970 births
People from Raalte
Dutch physical chemists
21st-century Dutch chemists
20th-century Dutch chemists
Academic staff of Technische Universität Darmstadt
Dutch expatriates in Germany
Max Planck Institute for Polymer Research people
Computational chemists
Dutch expatriates in Switzerland
University of Twente alumni